is a Japanese anime television series conceptualized by Hiroshi Nishikiori and produced by TV Tokyo, Yomiko Advertising, Bandai Visual, and Pierrot. It is directed by Nishikiori, with Mamiko Ikeda handling series scripts, Hiromi Katō designing the characters, Seimei Maeda being in charge of mechanical design and Yoshikazu Suo composing the music. The series was licensed for release in the United States by Synch-Point, but its domestic distribution license has since expired. The American DVD release was never completed, due to poor marketing and distribution, and thus, poor sales.

Plot
The story follows Yuusuke Kamoshita, who is living alone until he stumbles across a naked girl in a forest, a very energetic girl named Noelle. Noelle and her entire family proceed to move into Yuusuke's tiny home, replacing it with a huge plastic-looking castle, and disrupt his life. Shortly into the series, Yuusuke writes a note to his crush Natsumi Suzuhara apologizing for a few "incidents", in which he also exclaims that she is an angel to him. Noelle later finds the note and decides she wants to be Yuusuke's angel. Silky and her minions interfere as the series goes on.

Characters

Noelle is an energetic angel in training. She shows great affection towards Yuusuke and is determined to become an angel. She often devises ways of taking off on a short runway, the roof of the house, in order to fly which is important on being an angel. She has vowed to marry Yuusuke once she has completed her training to becoming an angel for Yuusuke. At the end of the series, she and Yuusuke show that they love each other very much.

Yuusuke is admired by Noelle but does not return her affection initially. He too is overlooked by the girl he has a crush on, Natsumi. He is passive and can do little when Noelle and her monster-like family move into his lonely house. He tries to keep quiet about their residence when he is not in the house and tries to keep things from turning chaotic within the house. At first he didn't agree with being Noelle's husband but in the end, he falls in love with Noelle.

Natsumi is Yuusuke's classmate, whom he has a crush on. She is an athletic diver. She is often spied upon by Yuusuke and his classmates from a small window at the diving complex at their school. She has a serious personality. She has a boyfriend named Kai, who wears glasses, and seems older than she does. Kai was her brother's best friend, and ever since his death, she had substituted Kai as her brother. She has had encounters with an angel, her deceased brother Fuyuki, which is proven later to be Raphael at the very end of the series.
At the beginning she seems to dislike Yuusuke because she believes he is a pervert, but later begins to get attracted to him.

Papa is Noelle's father, and is a Frankenstein monster-like creature. He has a calm demeanour. He usually calls Yuusuke "son in law".

Mama is Noelle's mother. She is the most normal, though absent minded, member of the family of monsters, although she shows another side of herself in one episode (she's actually a crazy witch).

Granny (Baba) is Noelle's grandmother and is a witch. She strongly dislikes humans and, therefore, is against Noelle wanting to marry Yuusuke.

Gabriel is Noelle's older brother, and is a vampire. He enjoys teasing Yuusuke, and has horribly bad allergies to cats. When Miruru becomes the maid of the family Gabriel eventually gets used to her.

Sara is Noelle's older sister. She has the power to turn invisible, and spends a lot of her time in this form. Others find it hard to tell when she is there or not, and she also becomes attracted to Yuusuke. Later in the series when she meets Mikael she falls in love with him- but he and Raphael are a couple.

Lucca is Noelle's younger sister, and is an elven-looking creature. She is a mad scientist, and often makes different mechanical devices to help Noelle learn to fly and become an angel. In one of the episodes when she meets up with Eros she gets interested in him because of his speed. When Eros tells her his speed is due to his love for Silky, she thinks it is a silly idea because of her obsession for science.

Dispel is the initial antagonist of the series, or so the audience is led to believe. He has several henchmen who he dispatches to thwart Noelle's attempts to become an angel and often treats his slave Silky unkindly. At the end of the first season, it is seen that he was a toy of Silky's. He is destroyed by her, and Silky takes his place as the series' main antagonist.

Originally when Dispel appeared to be in control, Silky seemed to be a dominated slave. During the second season it is revealed that she was strong willed and is more scheming and power hungry than Dispel was. Silky's intentions are unclear though she sends her minions to interfere with Noelle's training at every opportunity. At the end of the series, it is revealed that Silky, Mikael, and Noelle grew from three parts of a shattered angel-egg. So they must all become angels together or not at all. Silky does not want to become an angel which is why she is resisting the efforts of Noelle. At the end, Silky is dragged against her will to join the other two and become angels. Noelle persuades her to accept this.

Miruru, a catgirl, originally appears to be one of Dispel's henchmen but is revealed to be Dispel's daughter later in the series. She is in love with Gabriel, but because of his allergy to cats, he initially hates her. After the first season when Dispel is destroyed she becomes free of him and dedicates herself to being the maid of the house and stays with the family.

Muse is a shapeshifter whose ability is limited to changing into inanimate objects. She is a reluctant henchmen and only obeys orders so that she is not punished. She is never successful on her missions and is punished anyway, however. Noelle and the others never seem to notice that she is around which is partially due to her shapeshifting ability and partly due to her ineptness at interfering. She is madly in love with Eros and will doing anything he orders. She can be a bit of a crybaby at some points.

Eros is a demon-like creature that is a henchmen just as Muse is. He doesn't seem to notice Muse's affection towards him, instead going out of the way to please Silky and win her affection. Along with Muse, he bumps into Ruka in one episode and befriends her.

Mikael is a puzzling character in the beginning of I'm Gonna Be An Angel. In the beginning of the anime, it is apparent that he shares an intangible relation with Noelle, even to the extent in which he is capable of speaking to her through telepathy. He encourages her to become an angel. He carries the Book of Chaos, in which the text fills a single page for each instance in which Noelle accomplishes an angelic deed. He seem to be in a romantic relationship with Raphael.

Raphael is an angel whose foremost physical feature is a singular wing. He is a professor at the Angel School with Mikael as his student. He cannot be seen by most of the human world, with Noelle, Mikael, and Natsumi as exceptions and only Mikael can touch him. However, he does influence certain events of the series, in particular rescuing Noelle, Yuusuke, and child Natsumi when he grants Noelle the temporary power of flight as they fall from the clock tower in episode 13. He is benevolent and willing to assist Mikael and Noelle in their quest to become angels, and he has a romantic relationship with Mikael.

She is Noelle and Yuusuke's class teacher in school.

One of Yuusuke's classmate.

Yuusuke's classmate who wears glasses.

Episode list

Music
Opening Theme:

Lyrics by: Miyu Yuzuki
Performed by: COMA
(Composition and arrangement by: Yoshikazu Suo, Song by: Mimi Koishi)

Ending Theme:

Lyrics, composition and song by: Sizzle Ohtaka
Arrangement by: Yoshikazu Suo

North American distribution
Indication that I'm Gonna Be An Angel! was licensed in North America was revealed on Studio Pierrot's website early 2001, but there was no mention on who the licensor was. In March 2001, Synch-Point officially announced they had acquired I'm Gonna Be An Angel! with FLCL for North American distribution. Volume one was released on VHS on July 10, 2001 as Synch-Point's debut title and later released on DVD on April 23, 2002. Volume two was delayed for a month and then again to an indefinite date. Two years after the first release of the first volume, Synch-Point announced they would release volume two on January 27, 2004, but it was delayed again until March 30, 2004 because of cover design issues.

At Fanime 2005, Synch-Point told the public that I'm Gonna Be An Angel had not been making a profit for them so they had to "raise funds with other projects first". They planned to release volume four to six as a set, but no releases have been made after volume three was released on January 4, 2005, almost a year after volume two was released. In 2008, Synch-Point's parent company, Broccoli International USA, ceased operations.

In 2017, the Tubi streaming service began offering the first thirteen episodes of I'm Gonna Be An Angel! in Japanese with English subtitles.

References

External links
 

1999 anime television series debuts
Fantasy anime and manga
Pierrot (company)
Romantic comedy anime and manga
TV Tokyo original programming